Tony Mario Sylva (born 17 May 1975) is a Senegalese former professional footballer who played as a goalkeeper.

He spent the vast majority of his 16-year professional career in France, playing in 157 Ligue 1 games during eight seasons and representing in the competition Monaco and Lille.

Sylva appeared with Senegal in the 2002 World Cup and four Africa Cup of Nations tournaments. He is the current goalkeeping coach of Senegal, appointed by Aliou Cissé in 2015.

Club career
Born in Guédiawaye, Sylva spent nearly a decade at the service of AS Monaco FC, but featured mainly for the reserve team during his spell, being successively backup to Fabien Barthez and Flavio Roma in the main squad. He made his debut in Ligue 1 on 12 September 1999 in a 1–2 away against Stade Rennais FC, contributing with six appearances as the club won the national championship; he also served loans at Gazélec Ajaccio, SAS Épinal and AC Ajaccio before leaving in 2004, the latter two sides competing in Ligue 2.

Sylva subsequently signed for Lille OSC on a free transfer, never appearing in fewer than 30 league games in his four years and helping his team to the second position in 2004–05. He retired in June 2010 at the age of 35, after two seasons in Turkey with Trabzonspor; although his contract with the former was due to expire in June 2009, according to Article 17 of FIFA's regulations for the status and transfer of players he was allowed to leave the club.

International career
Sylva earned 83 caps for Senegal, during nine years. His debut came on 6 June 1999, in a 2–2 draw in Burkina Faso for the 2000 African Cup of Nations qualifiers.

Sylva's was his country's first-choice at the 2002 FIFA World Cup, helping the Lions of Teranga to the quarter-finals in their first appearance in the competition.

Honours
Monaco
Ligue 1: 1999–2000
Coupe de la Ligue: 2002–03

Lille
UEFA Intertoto Cup: 2004

Trabzonspor
Turkish Cup: 2009–10

Senegal
Africa Cup of Nations: runner-up 2002

References

External links

1975 births
Living people
Senegalese footballers
Association football goalkeepers
Ligue 1 players
Ligue 2 players
Championnat National players
AS Monaco FC players
Gazélec Ajaccio players
SAS Épinal players
AC Ajaccio players
Lille OSC players
Süper Lig players
Trabzonspor footballers
Senegal international footballers
2002 FIFA World Cup players
2002 African Cup of Nations players
2004 African Cup of Nations players
2006 Africa Cup of Nations players
2008 Africa Cup of Nations players
Senegalese expatriate footballers
Expatriate footballers in France
Expatriate footballers in Monaco
Expatriate footballers in Turkey
Senegalese expatriate sportspeople in France
Senegalese expatriate sportspeople in Turkey
Association football goalkeeping coaches